The following is a list of massacres that have occurred in Bulgaria and its predecessors:

References

Bulgaria
Massacres
Massacres in Bulgaria
Massacres